is one of three basic styles of Japanese cuisine and a highly ritualized form of serving food, in which prescribed dishes are carefully arranged and served on legged trays; full-course dinner, regular dinner. Honzen has largely disappeared since the mid 20th century, though a few restaurants still serve what they bill as honzen ryōri. It largely survives today as one of the main influences of kaiseki cuisine.

History
Honzen arose among warrior households in the Muromachi period (14th century), in contrast to the earlier  (9th century) of the aristocracy. This corresponded with the rise and subsequent entrenchment of the power of the warrior class viz-a-viz the nobility.

During the Muromachi period after the shōgun Ashikaga Yoshimitsu in the 14th century, developed an elaborate formal system of meal-serving, known as (. A quadruple-holed tray-set would be reserved for the Imperial house. 

Honzen has mostly fallen out of practice in the post-World War II period.

References

External links 
Hyper Tokyo: A Look at the Closing Gap on Japanese Culture
Kiea.jp, Traditional Japanese Cuisine, PDF format

Japanese cuisine terms